Sophia Zoungas  is a clinical endocrinologist from Victoria, Australia. She is recognised for her work in the management of diabetes and its vascular complications and leads Australia's largest translational research program in diabetes care and benchmarking of diabetes services. Zoungas's research explores the link between diabetes, glucose levels and cardiovascular risks and has enabled people with diabetes to be prescribed medication that reduce their cardiovascular risk factors. She is head of the School of Public Health and Preventative Medicine at Monash University and is the Professor of Diabetes, Vascular Health and Ageing and is also Deputy Director of Research at Alfred Health.

In 2022 Zoungas was elected as a fellow of the Australian Academy of Health and Medical Sciences and in the same year was awarded the Kellion Award from the Australian Diabetes Society.

References 

Living people
Australian endocrinologists
Fellows of the Australian Academy of Health and Medical Sciences
Academic staff of Monash University
Year of birth missing (living people)